Itapeva is a city in the state of São Paulo, Brazil. The population is 94,804 (2020 est.) in an area of 1826.26 km².

History

The city was founded as a village in the beginning of the 18th century. In 1769 the municipality was created, by separating it from Sorocaba. Named Itapeva da Faxina until 1910 and Faxina until 1938. In Tupi language, Itapeva means “flat stone”.

Founder: Antônio Furquim Pedroso.

In Itapeva is located the Wall of the Slaves, which is a tourist point, in addition to the Vila Isabel Station, the Pilão D’Agua and the Dr. Pinheiro Promenade.

Geography
Itapeva is located at an elevation of 684 meters.

HDI
HDI (HDI-M): 0,745
(Fonte: IPEADATA)

Hydrography
 Apiaí-Guaçu River
 Taquari River
 Pirituba River
 Taquari-Mirim River
 Taquari-Guaçu River

Highways
 SP-249
 SP-258 Francisco Alves Negrão Highway

Districts
Itapeva has three districts
 Guarizinho
 Alto da Brancal
 Areia Branca

Climate

The coldest month is June (mean temperature 15.1 °C, 59°F), and the hottest
is January (mean 22.7 °C, 73 °F). Rainfall averages 1254 mm.

Governance
 Mayor: Mário Tassinari ( PSDB ) 2021-2025

Higher education
 Faculdade Metodista do Sul Paulista
 FAIT
 UNESP - São Paulo State University
 UNIGRAN NET
 FATEC Internacional
 FACINTER

References

 
Populated places established in 1769